Jerrabomberra is one of the original 18 districts of the Australian Capital Territory. It is situated to the southeast of South Canberra, south of the Molonglo River, east of Woden Valley and north east of Tuggeranong and west of the New South Wales border. It includes the suburbs of Beard, Hume, Oaks Estate and Symonston and the military communications and logistics facility . It is named after Jerrabomberra Creek, which runs through it, Jerrabomberra is derived from the Aboriginal word, meaning "afraid of lightning".

Jerrabomberra includes the "urban village" of Oaks Estate, which was formerly part of Queanbeyan, broadacre uses in Symonston (including the headquarters of Geoscience Australia and the Therapeutic Goods Administration), light industry in Hume and Symonston, HMAS Harman and rural areas. It is crossed by the Monaro Highway and Canberra Avenue.

History
The Jerrabomberra was designated by the Districts Act of 1966 as one of the 18 districts of the Australian Capital Territory.

References

Districts of the Australian Capital Territory
1966 establishments in Australia